Hydroscapha monticola, is a species of skiff beetle native to India and Sri Lanka.

Description
Sri Lanka forms are slightly larger than the Indian ones according to the type specimens. This tiny species has a total body length of about 1.17 to 1.34 mm. Length of the fore body is 0.82 to 0.97 mm. Elytra length of male is 0.58 to 0.63 mm and female is 0.56 to 0.62 mm. Body is brown to dark brown in color. Head, as well as posterior and anterior margins of pronotum and anterior part of elytra are slightly darker brown. Male has bisinuate sternite V on posterior margin, with two tufts. The posterior margin is not denticulate. Sternite VI clothed with regularly arranged setae. Aedeagus is about 0.32 to 0.33 mm long which is slightly sinuate in lateral view. Female has trilobate apically trilobate sternite VI with blunt at apex. Tergite VI is simply rounded apically. It is commonly found in the altitudes between 1800 and 2800 m.

References 

Myxophaga
Insects of Sri Lanka
Insects described in 1996